Northbrooks Secondary School (NBrSS) is a co-educational government secondary school located in Yishun, Singapore.

History
Northbrooks opened with its first intake on 3 January 2000 with eight Secondary 1 classes. Built at a cost of over S$23 million, the school is fully equipped with IT facilities and is set amidst the surroundings of Yishun Park.

CCA

Name origin 
The name Northbrooks is derived from the Chinese idiom yin shui si yuan (饮水思源), which means to think of the source when one drinks water. Its meaning has two aspects: 1. to have water to drink depends on all kinds of conditions. 2. The quality of the water depends on its source.

Facilities
Facilities in the school includes The Brooks, a park which contains different plant and animal species, four computer labs, a rock wall, a street soccer court, and an indoor sports hall. Examinations are usually conducted in the air-conditioned CD Shelter, the hall, or in classrooms. There is also a gym located on the first floor beside the Green Room (detention room). There is a lounge for students called the ‘Champions Lodge’, containing gaming consoles such as the PlayStation 4 and the Xbox 360 for students’ enjoyment. There are also board games and a large black board for students to draw on, for the expression of their creativity. There is also a parking space for bicycles for students who cycle to school.

References

External links
Northbrooks Secondary School

Educational institutions established in 2000
Secondary schools in Singapore
Yishun
2000 establishments in Singapore